
Gmina Kikół is a rural gmina (administrative district) in Lipno County, Kuyavian-Pomeranian Voivodeship, in north-central Poland.

Villages
Gmina Kikół contains the villages and settlements of Ciełuchowo, Dąbrówka, Grodzeń, Hornówek, Janowo, Jarczechowo, Kikół, Kikół-Wieś, Kołat-Rybniki, Konotopie, Lubin, Moszczonne, Niedźwiedź, Sumin, Trutowo, Walentowo, Wawrzonkowo, Wola, Wolęcin, Wymyślin and Zajeziorze.

Neighbouring gminas
Gmina Kikół is bordered by the gminas of Chrostkowo, Czernikowo, Lipno and Zbójno.

References
Polish official population figures 2006

Kikol
Lipno County